Fort Branch is a stream in Lincoln County in the U.S. state of Missouri. It is a tributary of Cuivre River.

Fort Branch took its name from Stout's Fort, a bygone fortification near its course.

See also
List of rivers of Missouri

References

Rivers of Lincoln County, Missouri
Rivers of Missouri